The Uniques were a Chicago-based doo-wop group, active in the early 1960s, recorded by Lenny LaCour, and signed to Demand/Dot Records.

References

Musical groups from Chicago
Doo-wop groups